Rene Charland (November 13, 1928 – September 30, 2013), nicknamed "The Champ", was an American stock car racing driver. He was a four-time champion of the NASCAR National Sportsman Division, now known as the Xfinity Series.

Career 
Charland was born in Chicopee, Massachusetts on November 13, 1928 and made his home in Agawam. His racing career began in 1949 at Riverside Park Speedway in Massachusetts. By the 1960s he was part of a group of Northeastern racers called "The Eastern Bandits" who moved to the Mid-Atlantic and South to compete in NASCAR competition. In 1962 Charland won his first championship in the NASCAR National Sportsman Division, now the XFinity Series. He won the title again the following three years, and finished third in the series' 1966 standings despite missing half of the season due to an injury suffered at Albany-Saratoga Speedway. His run of four straight championships gave Charland the nickname "The Champ", a name he became better known by than his given name, which was pronounced "REE-nee".

Charland also competed in the NASCAR Grand National Series, running nine races between 1964 and 1971, including the 1966 Daytona 500, posting a best career finish of third at Fonda Speedway in 1966.

Charland was estimated as having won over 700 races during his career. He was an inductee into the New England Antique Racers Hall of Fame and the Northeast Dirt Modified Hall of Fame. In his later years Charland suffered from dementia.  He died on September 30, 2013, in a nursing home in Amsterdam, New York.

Motorsports career results

NASCAR 
(key) (Bold – Pole position awarded by qualifying time. Italics – Pole position earned by points standings or practice time. * – Most laps led.)

Grand National Series

References

External links

1928 births
2013 deaths
People from Chicopee, Massachusetts
Racing drivers from Massachusetts
NASCAR drivers
People from Agawam, Massachusetts